Costantino D'Orazio (born 1974 in Rome) is an Italian art critic and curator.

Expositions 
D'Orazio worked on many exhibitions and artistic installations, including:

Mario Merz. Un segno nel Foro di Cesare (Rome, 2003)
Mimmo Paladino a Villa Pisani (Villa Pisani, Stra, 2008)
 Intorno a Borromini (Rome, 2009)
Speranze & Dubbi. Arte giovane tra Italia e Libano (Beirut, 2008 and Torino, 2009)
I Classici del Contemporaneo (Villa Pisani, Stra, 2009)
Oliviero Rainaldi – Tutto Scorre (Villa Pisani, Stra, 2011).

Bibliography

References 

1974 births
Living people
Italian art critics
Italian art curators